San José de Pare is a town and municipality in the Ricaurte Province, part of the department of Boyacá, Colombia. The border between San José de Pare and the department of Santander is formed by the Suárez River. The other municipalities bordering San José de Pare are Chitaraque, Togüí, Moniquirá and Santana.

Etymology 
San José de Pare is named after the Pare indigenous people, who inhabited the area before the Spanish conquest.

History 
San José de Pare was founded on November 3, 1780, by Pedro Antonio Flórez, as part of the now defunct Vélez Province. On September 29, 1819, Simón Bolívar passed through the town. In 1857, the department of Boyacá was created and San José de Pare passed over to belong to Boyacá, while the rest of the former province went to become part of Santander.

Economy 
Economical activities of San José de Pare are mining, ecotourism and agriculture. Main products cultivated in small farmfields are sugarcane, coffee, beans, maize, bananas and yuca.

Gallery

References 

Municipalities of Boyacá Department
Populated places established in 1780
1780 establishments in the Spanish Empire